Heruk (also Romanized as Herūk, Harook, and Harūk; also known as Horok, Howrūk, and Hūrūk) is a village in Tirjerd Rural District, in the Central District of Abarkuh County, Yazd Province, Iran. At the 2006 census, its population was 420, in 107 families.

References 

Populated places in Abarkuh County